KBYR is part of the BYU-Idaho Radio group, and is found at 91.5 FM in Rexburg, Idaho.

Broadcast area and content 
91.5 FM KBYR is one of three stations run by the BYU-Idaho radio group, each with a different emphasis. It uses the tagline "Always Inspirational" as well as the radio group's overall motto of "Be informed. Be inspired."   BYU-Idaho Radio originates from Brigham Young University-Idaho and is primarily received in the communities of Rexburg, Idaho Falls, and Pocatello, Idaho.

While its sister station KBYI focuses mainly on local and national news, KBYR is more focused on religious content. Broadcasts primarily contain music by Christian artists, talks by leaders from the Church of Jesus Christ of Latter-day Saints, and live broadcasts of the weekly devotional on the BYU-Idaho campus.

Content for the stations’ programs is derived, planned, and produced by BYU-Idaho students in an effort to provide them with real-world educational opportunities. Approximately 20 students work for BYU-Idaho Radio each semester, learning skills from audio engineering to live news production.

Listeners may tune into BYU-Idaho Radio stations by listening live locally, joining a live stream, or by subscribing to downloadable podcasts.

Sister stations 
KBYR has two sister stations, KBYI which broadcasts on 94.3 FM, as well as an online streaming station called BYU-Idaho Radio Online.

References

External links
KBYR website

Brigham Young University–Idaho
BYR
Radio stations established in 1960
1960 establishments in Idaho